Catholic University of Trujillo is a Peruvian private university located in Trujillo, Peru. It was born as an initiative of the Archdiocese of Trujillo on December 12, 1999, being Archbishop of Trujillo Héctor Miguel Cabrejos Vidarte, and taking as the first President of the Commission of Government the person of Jose Maria Garcia Madariaga. The operation of the university was authorized by resolution UCT 147-2000-CONAFU on November 13, 2000, and academic activities began on January 2, 2001.

See also
National University of Trujillo
Cesar Vallejo University
Private University of the North

External links
official Website (Spanish)

Universities in Trujillo, Peru